The 1891 Central Colonels football team represented Central University in Richmond, Kentucky during the 1891 college football season.

Schedule

References

Central
Eastern Kentucky Colonels football seasons
College football winless seasons
Central Colonels football